Faghme Abrahams is a former South African cricketer, who played cricket during the apartheid-era. As a non-white player, he was restricted to playing in the Howa Bowl, which was not classified as first-class cricket at the time. The games were retrospectively given first-class status during the early 1990s.

Abrahams played for Eastern Province between 1974 and 1987, appearing in at least 60 first-class matches. In the 1978–79 season, when Eastern Province won the Howa Cup, Abrahams was their leading run-scorer, accumulating 227 runs at an average of 25.22. His highest score in first-class cricket was made in March 1978 against Transvaal, when he scored 86 runs in the second innings to help his side to victory.

Notes

References 

South African cricketers
Living people
Year of birth missing (living people)